Victor Derek Robert Snell (29 October 1927 – 20 August 2009) was an English professional footballer who played as a full back.

Career
Born in Samford, Snell signed for Ipswich Town from Nicholians in 1945. He turned professional in 1947 and made his debut in 1949. His last appearance for Ipswich came in 1959, although he stayed with the club as a registered player until 1963. In total, Snell made 62 appearances for Ipswich in the Football League, scoring 2 goals.

Between 1959 and 1963, Snell combined his playing duties with coaching duties, becoming a first-team coach at Ipswich.

Snell later played in South Africa for Port Elizabeth City.

Later life and death
After retiring as a player, Snell lived in South Africa and Zimbabwe, before returning to England in 1992.

Snell died on 20 August 2009, at the age of 81, following a long illness.

References

1927 births
2009 deaths
Sportspeople from Suffolk
English footballers
Association football fullbacks
Ipswich Town F.C. players
Port Elizabeth City F.C. players
English Football League players